Indonesia competed at the 2014 Summer Youth Olympics, in Nanjing, China from 16 August to 28 August 2014. 27 athletes competed for Indonesia in this Youth Summer Olympics.

Medalists

Archery

Indonesia qualified a female archer from its performance at the 2013 World Archery Youth Championships and a male archer from its performance at the 2013 Asian Archery Championships.

Individual

Team

Athletics

Indonesia qualified one athlete.

Qualification Legend: Q=Final A (medal); qB=Final B (non-medal)

Girls
Field events

Badminton

Indonesia qualified two athletes based on the 2 May 2014 BWF Junior World Rankings.

Singles

Doubles

Legend: F= Advanced to Final; BM= Advanced to Bronze-medal match ; SF= Advanced to Semi Final ; QF=Advanced to Semi Final

Basketball

Indonesia qualified a boys' and girls' team based on the 1 June 2014 FIBA 3x3 National Federation Rankings.

Skills Competition

Boys' tournament

Roster
 Kurniawan Indraprasto
 Vincent Kosasih
 Rivaldo Pangesthio
 Widyanta Teja

Group stage

Girls' tournament

Roster
 Ni Nyoman Astari
 Calista Elvira
 Regita Pramesti
 Ida Ayu Wijaya

Group stage

Beach volleyball

Indonesia qualified a boys' and girls' team by their performance at the AVC qualification tournament.

Rowing

Indonesia qualified one boat based on its performance at the Asian Qualification Regatta.

Qualification Legend: FA=Final A (medal); FB=Final B (non-medal); FC=Final C (non-medal); FD=Final D (non-medal); SA/B=Semifinals A/B; SC/D=Semifinals C/D; R=Repechage

Sailing

Indonesia qualified two boats based on its performance at the Byte CII Asian Continental Qualifier.

Shooting

Indonesia was given a wild card to compete.

Individual

Team

Swimming

Indonesia qualified four swimmers.

Boys

Girls

Weightlifting

Indonesia qualified 1 quota in the girls' events based on the team ranking after the 2013 Weightlifting Youth World Championships. Indonesia later qualified 1 quota in the boys' events based on the team ranking after the 2014 Asian Weightlifting Youth & Junior Championships.

Boys

Girls

References

2014 in Indonesian sport
Nations at the 2014 Summer Youth Olympics
Indonesia at the Youth Olympics